Morning Show Mysteries is a series which airs on Hallmark Movies & Mysteries channel. Hallmark announced its first mystery series starring people of color on July 31, 2017. The episodes are based on the Billy Blessing novels by Al Roker. They star Holly Robinson Peete, Rick Fox and Colin Lawrence. The first aired in 2018.

Series overview
The theme for the Morning Show Mysteries series centers around a Seattle-based, TV chef Billie Blessings (Robinson Peete) as she becomes involved in various murder criminal investigations, and her relationship with police detective Ian Jackson (Fox) who is in charge of the homicide unit.

As of 2021, Rick Fox left the series and was replaced by Colin Lawrence playing the new head of homicide, Detective Sergeant Tyrell Price.

Cast and characters
 Belinda "Billie" Blessings (Holly Robinson Peete) is a chef, restaurant owner, and morning show segment host.
 Ian Jackson (Rick Fox) is a police detective in charge of the homicide unit. (2018–2019)
 Cassandra "Cassie" Shaw (Karen Robinson) is Billie's aunt and manages her restaurant, Blessings Kitchen.
 Maurice (Greg Rogers) is a former convict who now cooks for Blessings Kitchen and has a dog named Feathers.
 Phil (Jesse Moss) is a producer on the morning TV show and often helps Billie investigate the murders.
 Lance (David Lewis) is a co-host on the morning TV show.
Wallace "Wally (Osric Chau)
 Tyrell Price (Colin Lawrence) is the new head of Homicide after Ian leaves.

List of episodes

References 

Entertainment Studios films
English-language films
American mystery drama films
Hallmark Channel original programming
Hallmark Channel original films
American drama television films